River Manafwa is a natural river found in Eastern Uganda. The river originates from Mount Elgon in east Uganda, and traverses the districts of Bududa, Manafwa, Mbale and Butaleja. It joins the Mpologoma River, which empties into Lake Kyoga. The river basin is prone to flooding, which disrupts transportation between the Bududa and Manafwa districts, and has resulted in damage to buildings and deaths.

The  River Manafwa basins have for long been of great socialeconomic importance to the population in the region. The river area possess phosphate and iron deposits with quarry sites around the river. These quarries are a source of income for indigenous people who produce aggregate stones, hardcore and sand mining along the river beds for the construction industry. The river is also a source of water to surrounding areas.

References 

Manafwa District
Manafwa